Cylindrocopturus quercus is a species of Zygopini (twig and stem weevils) in the family Curculionidae.  It is found in North America.

References

Further reading

 
 
 
 
 

Curculionidae
Beetles described in 1831